Arizona Territory is a 1950 American Western film directed by Wallace Fox and written by Adele Buffington. The film stars Whip Wilson, Andy Clyde, Nancy Saunders, Dennis Moore, John Merton and Carol Henry. The film was released on July 2, 1950, by Monogram Pictures.

Plot

Cast          
Whip Wilson as Jeff Malloy
Andy Clyde as Luke Watson
Nancy Saunders as Doris Devin
Dennis Moore as Greg Lance
John Merton as Otis Kilburn
Carol Henry as Joe
Carl Mathews as Steve Cramer 
Frank Austin as Jud 
Bud Osborne as Stableman

References

External links
 

1950 films
1950s English-language films
American Western (genre) films
1950 Western (genre) films
Monogram Pictures films
Films directed by Wallace Fox
American black-and-white films
1950s American films